The 2012–13 St. Louis Blues season was the 46th season for the National Hockey League (NHL) franchise that was established on June 5, 1967. The regular season was reduced from its usual 82 games to 48 due to the 2012–13 NHL lockout.

Off-season
On January 6, 2013, after a 113-day lockout, the NHL Owners and Players reached a new Collective Bargaining Agreement (CBA), ratified on both sides by January 12, 119-days after the lockout. The old CBA expired on September 15, 2012, precipitating the lockout of the players by the owners. The new CBA has to be ratified by both the owners and players before the season can begin. On the same day, team owner Tom Stillman released a statement apologizing to the fans for the more-than-three-month lockout.

The Blues and the NHL released the new playing schedules for 2013, covering 48 games instead of the usual 82. The Blues open the season at home on January 19 against the Detroit Red Wings.

Fox Sports Midwest will broadcast 41 of the 48 games. NBC/NBC Sports will broadcast the remaining seven.

On the eve of the start of the abbreviated 2012–13 season on January 19, the Blues trimmed their roster to 23 by the January 18 deadline.

Regular season

January
The first game of the 48-game season scored a first for the Blues: the first shutout in the first game of the season in their 46-year history. A 6–0 shutout of Detroit at home by Jaroslav Halak (14th with the Blues; facing only 14 shots) featured a two-goal game on his first two NHL shots by acclaimed Russian rookie Vladimir Tarasenko, two goals by Chris Stewart and a short-handed goal by T. J. Oshie, with four of the six goals on the power-play, to a standing-room-only crowd of 20,035 in attendance.

The opening game was the highest-rated Blues season or home opener on FOX Sports Midwest. It averaged a 6.0 household rating, making it the highest-rated program in prime time in St. Louis on Saturday.

The second game of the season, on Monday January 21 against the Nashville Predators, was the highest-rated regular season Blues telecast ever on FOX Sports Midwest. The Blues' 4–3 shootout win at Nashville generated a 7.4 household rating in the St. Louis DMA, according to Nielsen Media Research. That easily tops the previous regular season high of 6.3 set March 13, 2012 at Chicago. The Monday telecast peaked at a 9.1 rating (113,000 households) during the shootout. The Blues Live postgame show followed with an impressive 4.7 rating.

On January 27, the Blues honored the late St. Louis Cardinals' baseball Hall of Famer Stan Musial, who died in Ladue, Missouri, on January 19 at the age of 92. The Blues wore number 6 (Musial's number) on their warmup jerseys that were autographed and then auctioned to benefit Cardinals Care and the St. Louis Blues 14 fund.

February
On February 4, Blues' forward Vladimir Tarasenko was named by the NHL as January's Rookie of the Month, as he led all rookie forwards with nine points (five goals and four assists) in seven games in the month.

On February 13, goaltender Jake Allen made his first start in goal, against the Detroit Red Wings at Joe Louis Arena, where his team beat Detroit 4–3 in overtime, stopping 15 of 18 shots.

Vladimir Tarasenko was the early favorite to win the Calder Memorial Trophy as Rookie of the Year after the one-quarter mark (12 games) of the season, scoring six goals and five assists (11 points) in 13 games, playing only 14:27 average per game. On February 22, he was placed on the injured reserve list after getting hit on the head in the February 20 game in Colorado. His five points in his first two games tied him with Wayne Babych for the best start by a rookie in Blues' history.

On February 23 at home, Barret Jackman became the all-time Blues' leader in games played by a defenseman with his 616th game played since his debut on April 14, 2002. He has 22 goals and 121 assists for 143 points in his career and a plus-minus rating of +37. This season, he passed Bob Plager (615), Barclay Plager (614), Al MacInnis (613), Larry Patey (603) and Chris Pronger (598). Only forwards Bernie Federko (927), Brian Sutter (779), Brett Hull (744) and Garry Unger (662) have played in more games than Jackman.

After starting out with a 6–1 record in January, the Blues skidded to a 4–7–1 record in February, with a 1–5–1 record at home; in that span, they scored only 11 goals while giving up 26.

March
Rookie goaltender Jake Allen earned his first NHL shutout at home against the Phoenix Coyotes, stopping all 28 shots on March 14. It boosted his record to 7–1 in his first eight games.

Goaltender Jaroslav Halak tied Glenn Hall for the Blues' franchise record of 16 career shutouts when Halak shut-out the Edmonton Oilers on March 23, stopping all 19 shots on net. It was his 25th career shutout in the NHL. Roman Turek is third on the franchise list with 13 shutouts.

A freefall at the end of March, losing four of five games, dropped the Blues to eighth place in the Conference, just barely hanging on to a playoff spot.

A few days before the NHL trade deadline (April 3), the Blues, on March 30, picked up a left-shooting defenseman Jordan Leopold in a trade with the Buffalo Sabres to bolster its defense.

April
In his second trade in two days, on April 1, general manager Doug Armstrong, after pushing for 10 months, finally acquired left-shooting defenseman Jay Bouwmeester from the Calgary Flames. In his final trade, his third in four days, just before the deadline on April 3, Armstrong traded defenseman Wade Redden to the Boston Bruins for a conditional seventh-round draft pick in 2014.

April 16 saw head coach Ken Hitchcock earn his 600th NHL win with the 2–1 shootout victory over the Vancouver Canucks. He became the 11th NHL coach to reach that milestone. Of the 11, only two have higher career point percentages: Scotty Bowman (.657) and Joel Quenneville (.612), with Hitchcock at .595. Ironically, Bowman and Quenneville were both former Blues' coaches.

The Blues clinched a playoff spot in the top eight teams in the Western Conference after their 3–1 home win against the Colorado Avalanche on April 23, giving them a 27–17–2 (56 points) record. Final seeding will depend on the result of their final two games of the season at home against the Calgary Flames and Chicago Blackhawks, with a chance for fourth place giving them home advantage in the first round. They reached the playoffs for 25 consecutive years from 1979 to 2004, and their third in the last eight seasons.

The team was 17–14–2 (36 points), sitting at ninth place in the Western Conference at the end of March, and were in danger of not making the playoffs. A 12–3 run in April, however, pushed them to fourth place and home ice in the first round of the playoffs against the Los Angeles Kings.

Goaltender Brian Elliott was named the NHL's Second Star of the Month for April, with his franchise-record (including post-season) 11 wins in the month. He had an 11–2–0 record, 1.28 goals against average and .948 save percentage, with three shutouts in 13 games, to push the Blues into fourth place.

The Blues tied the Vancouver Canucks for most shutouts for in the NHL, with seven.

May
After the Blues' first-round loss, their third playoff loss in four seasons, sportswriter Bernie Miklasz asked why the Blues are so easily satisfied. He previously wrote that the team was good, but just not good enough.

Standings

Schedule and results
(all games on Fox Sports Midwest, except those on NBC/NBC Sports marked with a * ) 
 Blues' Schedule
 NBC/NBC Sports schedule

Playoffs

Key:  Win  Loss

Player statistics
Final stats 
Skaters

2012–13 NHL season – Skater – Summary – Wins

* indicates not currently on the active roster. 
+ indicates on Injured Reserve. 
Stats reflect time with Blues only. 
Stats reflect time with Blues only. 
Bold = leading team in category.

Goaltenders
(through game on April 27, 2013)   FINAL

(through game on May 10, 2013)   FINAL 

†Denotes player spent time with another team before joining the Blues.  Stats reflect time with the Blues only.
‡Traded mid-season
Bold/italics denotes franchise record

Awards and milestones

Awards

Milestones

Transactions
The Blues have been involved in the following transactions during the 2012–13 season

Trades

Free agents signed

 $468,293 (pro-rated over 48 games)

Free agents lost

Claimed via waivers

Lost via waivers

Lost via retirement

Player signings

Draft picks
St. Louis' picks at the 2012 NHL Entry Draft in Pittsburgh, Pennsylvania, at the Consol Energy Center from June 22–23, 2012.

Farm teams

Peoria Rivermen
The Peoria (Illinois) Rivermen are the Blues American Hockey League affiliate in 2012–13. 
On April 1, 2013, the Blues announced that the Vancouver Canucks on March 29 agreed to buy the Rivermen from the Blues, pending approval from the NHL. Details not available. It is expected the Blues will affiliate with the AHL's Chicago Wolves for the 2013–14 season. The Blues officially announced their affiliation with the Wolves on April 23, for at least three seasons. They play in the Allstate Arena in the Chicago suburb of Rosemont. The team was formerly affiliated with the Vancouver Canucks from 2011–2013, and the Atlanta Thrashers from 2001–2011. The swap was hard to take for the fans of the team, but the team's attendance was light, and the sponsorship not very strong. The team is one of the premier franchises in the AHL. The team's owner is Don Levin, coached by Scott Arniel, and their GM is Wendell Young.

Evansville IceMen
The Evansville IceMen are the Blues affiliate in the ECHL.

See also
 2012–13 NHL season
 St. Louis Blues seasons
 St. Louis (sports)

References

External links
2012–13 St. Louis Blues season at ESPN
2012–13 St. Louis Blues season at Hockey Reference

St. Louis Blues seasons
S
S
St Louis
St Louis